Cider syrup is also known as apple molasses. It is a fruit syrup concentrated from apple cider, first made in colonial America. It is a thick, dark brown, opaque syrup with concentrated apple flavor. The color is darker than honey and its flavor more tart than maple syrup.  A syrup-like product has a much longer shelf-life than the fresh fruit, thereby extending the apple harvest's contribution to diets throughout the year.

Cider syrup is a natural product which is easy to make, as it needs no additional reagents or special processes.  It is produced by boiling sweet cider, intermittently stirred, until the water content of the cider has evaporated. Many farms still produce apple cider syrup today in Maine, Massachusetts, and other parts of New England. It was historically an important sweetening agent for foods, especially as a substitute for imported cane sugar and molasses. Apple cider syrup was traditionally used in baking, for cakes, cookies, pies, baked beans, and similar recipes. It was also used as a table sweetener, to top pancakes and puddings, for example. Cider syrup contains nutrients such as sodium, potassium, sugars, vitamin A, vitamin C, calcium and magnesium.  It is an endangered regional food tradition of the United States.

History

Colonial America
The hard cider seemed to be the national beverage for much of the history of the United States During colonial America, water was considered to be hazardous. Hence, Americans took hard cider at every meal. Pilgrims rarely used cane sugar; they prefer the cider syrup as a sweetener. New England, eastern Massachusetts and Maine were rich in various kinds of apples.

American Revolution to Civil War
Cider syrup became very important as molasses and sugar were imported from British plantations in the West Indies. Hence, American patriots must persist in producing a home-brewed alternative sweetener. The Civil War boosted the producing of cider syrup once again, as Northerners would not use cane sugar because it was one of the outcomes from the slavery system. Cider syrup continued to be important in the US resound until the Prohibition, when many apple trees were destroyed. It even blocked the development and propagation of cider syrup.

Flavor profile 
Cider syrup survives to today. Its continued popularity may be due to its fruity acidity and complex layers of taste.  The taste of apple blossoms, citrus and honey is detectable from only one drop of cider syrup on the tongue. It  is rich, with a touch of smokiness in taste and aroma, from where the edge of the syrup is faintly charred during its preparation. These elements make the syrup distinctive.

The apple cider syrup has a bright and concentrated aroma of apples. It also has a dark colour and caramelized sweetness, which is specially balanced by sharp acidity that the result of the good sugar and acid balance found in most North American dessert.

The apple cider syrup is a thick, dark brown syrup. It is translucent-to-opaque, with a tangy bite. No extra food additives or sugar is added to the apple cider syrup. It tastes more tart than maple syrup.

Apples
The boiled cider was often produced from "sweeting" apples in early times that contained relatively less malic acid and were sweet. The various kinds of "Summer Sweeting," which is generally cited as a kind of apple applied in producing boiled cider, may refer to one or more very old New England apple varieties, such as the 'Hightop Sweet' from eastern Massachusetts, or the 'Sidney Sweet' from Maine. Farmers still look after the apple trees in an old-fashioned way: organically and sustainably.

Climate 
The temperature, amount of precipitation, sunshine duration and soil pH can all influence the growth and quality of apples in a place. It directly changes the sweetness and acidity of cider syrup. Hence, one year's cider syrup is never like the next year's. Otherwise, farmers sometimes have to purchase superior apples for cider and cider syrup from another orchard.

Processing

Historical production

The instruction of making the cider syrup was required to put fresh juice into an open, unreactive metal container and skim the surface as it boils down. The volume should be concentrated to approximate the one-seventh of the original. Hence, the apple cider syrup is labor-intensive and expensive to make. At least one early source declares that premium apple molasses can be produced by steam cooking apples in a container, weighing them down in slatted baskets and pressing their juice through the straw, and then reducing the expressed juice. Most manufacturers only ground, squeezed and boiled down the apple into fresh juice, fermented into alcohol or made cider syrup.

Gail Borden Jr., of New York City (who developed condensed milk as well) gained a patent for the "Improvement in Concentrating and Preserving for Use Cider and Other Juices of Fruits" (Patent No. 35,919, dated 22 July 1862). However, Borden does not advocate to evaporate the fresh apple cider, but to boil the cider or fruit juice in a vacuum kettle to maintain the qualities.

Modern  process
Contemporary manufacturers boil off the pure cider syrup in an evaporator,  just like the production of maple syrup from maple sap.

Storage stability 
Keeping away from light and under 10°C is the best method to extend the life of the cider syrup;  refrigeration is not essential, but provides ideal storage conditions. The syrup has a high concentration of sugar, so has antibacterial activity.

Commerce

Historic
Cider syrup represented a seasonal, local, and economical choice for various backcountry farmers, most of whom did not reside near the central coastal or riverine routes, like maple sugar. Historically, the early settlers all used boiled cider or cider jelly to make up the juice. This food was not only seemed as enjoyment but also considered to be intake nutrition during winter (many months). Otherwise, these productions were used as a raw material to make other fruit syrup, preserved fruit and jelly before the commercial development of pectin. This method was passed to today's kitchen from the traditional New England kitchen. The cider syrup not only provided a long shelf life to the apples, but also it brought higher incomes to farms, saleable at three to five times the price of the apples.

As westward expansion grew and the number of farms decreased in New England, in the years after the Civil War, the agricultural economy declined. As more people are attracted to locally grown food, small farms and orchards start to come back. There were fewer recipes after the Second World War. It is hard to find a business on the traditional cider syrup from New England. Due to its ease of production, boiled cider has mostly slipped out of the public consciousness and quietly become commercial obscurity, lying in the shadows of maple syrup and honey. At present, boiled cider is relatively little known except as a cultural artifact, and is absolutely under-appreciated, even in its traditional homeland of New England, US.

Recently
A new cider syrup related product was brought out from the Averill Farm in 2015 which is located in Massachusetts. In the times of weak trade, the workers from the Averill Farm found a new way of consuming the cider syrup, which had a great business prospect in the future. They realised the synergy that the cider syrup could have with other products from the farm. They started adding the cider syrup into the wine instead of adding sugar and honey into the wine. The new cider syrup related product had impressive sales on Franklin Country Cider Days. It had sales on the market at the end of November in that year. After that, the cider syrup won its customers in a short time.

In 2007, a young Slow Food chef in New Hampshire developed a kind of ice cream, "caramel apple gelato" that highlighted the caramelized and slightly smoky flavor of the syrup. Such culinary creativity will be significant to establish a new market potential and appreciation of the cider syrup, also securing their future. Apple cider syrup is very popular in cocktail bars and boutiques in the US, where new mixed drinks containing the syrup are being developed.

Nutrition 

Cider syrup contains total fat 2.9g, cholesterol 8mg, sodium 9mg, potassium 41mg, total carbohydrates 37.4g, Sugars 34g, Vitamin A 89IU, Vitamin C 1mg, Calcium 7mg and total calories 172 per serving. The cider syrup also contains the high pectin content of apple.

Festival 
"Cider Syrup Days" is a community event was held by the CISA organisation (Community Involved in Sustaining Agriculture). The tag of this event is 'North Hadley Sugar Shack', in Massachusetts. The Cider Syrup Days were operated for two days, from 7 am 7 to 1 November pm 8 November 2015.

Dishes 
List of recipes made with apple cider syrup.
 
 Cinnamon-Pear Rustic Tart
 Cider Cheese Fondue
 Apple Cider-Glazed Ham
 Autumn Sweet Rolls with Cider Glaze
 Apple Cider Chicken ‘n’ Dumplings
 Caramel Apple Strudel
 Pork & Cranberry Potpies
 Apple cider Doughnuts
 Apple Pancakes with Cider Syrup
 Sage Pork Chops with Cider Pan Gravy
 The Best Chicken and dumplings
 Caramel Apple Float
 Green Chili Shredded Pork
 Contest-Winning Caramel Apple Crisp
 Slow-Cooker Cider
 Sparkling Cider Pound cake
 Autumn Apple Chicken
 Apple cider Smash, 
 Zippy Chipotle Butternut Squash Soup 
 Butternut Squash Butter Farmhouse Pork and Apple pie
 Spiced Hot Apple Cider, 
 Cider-Glazed Pork Chops with Carrots 
 Thyme-Baked Apple Slices 
 Apple-Pecan Pork Tenderloin 
 Cider Jelly 
 Warm Spiced Cider Punch
 Autumn Beans 
 Grilled Rosemary Pork Roast 
 Almond-Crusted Chops with Cider Sauce 
 Sweet Potato-Cranberry Doughnuts
 Hot Cider with Orange Twists
 Cider-Brined Turkey, Spiced Applesauce
 Cran-Apple Turkey Skillet
 Mulled Red Cider
 Apple cider Cinnamon Rolls
 Apple Balsamic Chicken
 Maple-Walnut Sweet Potatoes
 Hot Apple Cider
 Cider Pork chops
 Sunday Supper Sandwiches
 Warm & Cozy Spiced Cider
 Cider Doughnuts
 Cider Pork Roast
 Fresh Apple & Pear Salad
 Southwest Shredded Pork Salad
 Apple Orchard Pork Roast.

See also
 List of apple dishes
 List of syrups

Notes

External links

Apple dishes
Cider
Syrup